Juan de Torquemada may refer to:

 Juan de Torquemada (cardinal) (1388—1468), Spanish cardinal and ecclesiastical author; uncle to Inquisitor, Tomás de Torquemada
 Fray Juan de Torquemada, Spanish Franciscan friar, missionary and historian of the New World

See also
 Torquemada (disambiguation)